Sydney Derby may refer to:
 Sydney Derby (A-League), association football (soccer) matches between A-League teams Sydney FC and Western Sydney Wanderers
 Sydney Derby (W-League), association football (soccer) matches between W-League teams Sydney FC and Western Sydney Wanderers
 Sydney Derby (BBL), cricket derby matches between Big Bash League teams Sydney Sixers and Sydney Thunder
 Sydney Derby (AFL), Australian rules football matches between the Sydney Swans and Greater Western Sydney Giants in the Australian Football League
 Sydney Derby (AIHL), Ice hockey matches between the Sydney Bears and Sydney Ice Dogs in the Australian Ice Hockey League
 Sydney Derby (NRC), Rugby union derby matches between National Rugby Championship teams Sydney Rays and Greater Sydney Rams

See also
 Australian Derby, a Group 1 horse race which takes place in Sydney
 Western Sydney Derby